The 1977 Berlin Marathon was the fourth running of the annual marathon race held in Berlin, West Germany, held on 10 September. There were two sections to the marathon in that year's running. The Berlin race hosted the West German national championship, which was started an hour after the regular mass race.

The men's and women's winners of the mass race were Great Britain's Norman Wilson (2:16:21) and West Germany's Angelika Brandt (3:10:27) while better results came in the West German championship through Günter Mielke (2:15:19) and Christa Vahlensieck (2:34:48). Vahlensieck's time was a marathon world record. A total of 230 runners finished the mass race, comprising 219 men and 11 women.

Mass results

Men

Women

West German championship results

Men

Women

References 

 West German Championships results. Association of Road Racing Statisticians. Retrieved 2020-06-24.
 Mass results. Association of Road Racing Statisticians. Retrieved 2020-06-24.
 Berlin Marathon results archive. Berlin Marathon. Retrieved 2020-06-24.
 40th Berlin Marathon. Berlin Marathon. Retrieved 2020-06-24.

External links 
 Official website

1977
Berlin Marathon
1970s in West Berlin
Berlin Marathon
Berlin Marathon